This is a list of 2004 events that occurred in Europe.

Events

January

February

March

April

May

June

July

August

September

October

November

December

Deaths

January

February

March

April

May

References 

 
2000s in Europe
Years of the 21st century in Europe